Satta is a 2003 Indian political drama film co-written and directed by Madhur Bhandarkar. It stars Raveena Tandon in the lead role and Atul Kulkarni, Govind Namdev and Sameer Dharmadhikari appear in the supporting roles. The film narrates the story of a persecuted wife of a greedy politician who takes on his role after he lands up in jail because of murder charges. Released on 7 February 2003, Satta received critical acclaim upon release and is considered one of the best performances of Tandon. The film was released on the same day as Khushi, Baaz: A Bird in Danger and Kash Aap Hamare Hote.

Plot
Anuradha Sehgal re-locates to Mumbai, finds employment, meets and weds Mumbai's aspiring Chief Minister, Vivek Chauhan. She soon finds out that Vivek is a womanizer and an alcoholic. She then faces physical abuse. Vivek is arrested for murder and is jailed. The Chauhan family persuade her to stand for elections in her husband's place, which she does. She then witnesses the nexus between the underworld, businessmen, corrupt policemen and politicians.

Cast
Raveena Tandon as Anuradha Sehgal/Anuradha Vivek Chauhan 
Sameer Dharmadhikari as Vivek Chauhan
Atul Kulkarni as Yashwant Varde
Govind Namdev as Liyaqat Ali Baig
Shrivallabh Vyas as Mahendra Chauhan
Amardeep Jha as Mrs Chauhan
Manoj Joshi as Uddhav Pawar
Sunil Chauhan as Police Inspector

Reception
Satta opened to generally positive reviews. Deepa Gumaste of Rediff.com wrote: "Raveena Tandon has obviously landed the role of a lifetime and she makes the most of it. She portrays the firebrand Anuradha with the kind of passion you wouldn't have expected from the heroine who once danced to the tune of Tu cheez badi hai mast." Taran Adarsh in his review wrote: "Raveena Tandon delivers a bravura performance. The actress takes giant strides as a performer, giving the right touches to her character. Here's a performance that's bound to be noticed." Komal Nahta in a less favourable review wrote: "On the whole, Satta is a non-starter. Pretending to be an intellectual film, it would not even appeal to the intelligentsia because it offers nothing new."

References

External links
 

2000s Hindi-language films
2000s political drama films
Indian political drama films
Films directed by Madhur Bhandarkar
2003 drama films
2003 films